Gasteruption is a genus of wasps belonging to the family Gasteruptiidae subfamily Gasteruptiinae.

European species
Species within this genus include:

 Gasteruption assectator (Linnaeus 1758)
 Gasteruption canariae Madl 1991
 Gasteruption diversipes (Abeille de Perrin 1879)
 Gasteruption dolichoderum Schletterer 1889
 Gasteruption erythrostomum (Dahlbom 1831)
 Gasteruption fallaciosum Semenov 1892
 Gasteruption floreum Szépligeti 1903
 Gasteruption forticorne Semenov 1892
 Gasteruption foveiceps Semenov 1892
 Gasteruption freyi (Tournier 1877)
 Gasteruption goberti (Tournier 1877)
 Gasteruption hastator (Fabricius 1804)
 Gasteruption hungaricum Szépligeti 1895
 Gasteruption ignoratum Kieffer 1903
 Gasteruption jaculator (Linnaeus 1758)
 Gasteruption laticeps (Tournier 1877)
 Gasteruption lugubre Schletterer 1889
 Gasteruption merceti Kieffer 1904
 Gasteruption minutum (Tournier 1877)
 Gasteruption nigrescens Schletterer 1885
 Gasteruption opacum (Tournier 1877)
 Gasteruption ortegae Madl 1991
 Gasteruption paternum Schletterer 1889
 Gasteruption pedemontanum (Tournier 1877)
 Gasteruption psilomma Kieffer 1904
 Gasteruption schossmannae Madl 1987
 Gasteruption subtile (Thomson 1883)
 Gasteruption tournieri Schletterer 1885
 Gasteruption undulatum (Abeille de Perrin 1879)
 Gasteruption variolosum (Abeille de Perrin 1879)

World Species
These 64 species belong to the genus Gasteruption:

 Gasteruption assectator (Linnaeus, 1758) g b (wild carrot wasp)
 Gasteruption boreale (Thomson, 1883) g
 Gasteruption canariae Madl, 1991 g
 Gasteruption caucasicum (Guerin-Meneville, 1844) g
 Gasteruption corniculigerum Enderlein, 1913 g
 Gasteruption dilutum Semenov, 1892 g
 Gasteruption dimidiatum Semenov, 1892 g
 Gasteruption diversipes (Abeille de Perrin, 1879) g
 Gasteruption dolichoderum Schletterer, 1889 g
 Gasteruption erythrostomum (Dahlbom, 1831) g
 Gasteruption expectatum Pasteels, 1957 c g
 Gasteruption fallaciosum Semenov, 1892 g
 Gasteruption flavicuspis Kieffer, 1911 c g
 Gasteruption floreum Szepligeti, 1903 g
 Gasteruption formilis Alekseev, 1995 g
 Gasteruption formosanum Enderlein, 1913 g
 Gasteruption forticorne Semenov, 1892 g
 Gasteruption foveiceps Semenov, 1892 g
 Gasteruption freyi (Tournier, 1877) g
 Gasteruption goberti (Tournier, 1877) g
 Gasteruption hastator (Fabricius, 1804) g
 Gasteruption hungaricum Szepligeti, 1895 g
 Gasteruption ignoratum Kieffer, 1903 g
 Gasteruption insidiosum Semenow, 1892 g
 Gasteruption jaculator (Linnaeus, 1758) g
 Gasteruption japonicum Cameron, 1888 g
 Gasteruption kaweahense b
 Gasteruption lacoulee Jennings, Krogmann & Parslow, 2015 g
 Gasteruption laticeps (Tournier, 1877) g
 Gasteruption lugubre Schletterer, 1889 g
 Gasteruption maquis Jennings, Krogmann & Parslow, 2015 g
 Gasteruption merceti Kieffer, 1904 g
 Gasteruption minutum (Tournier, 1877) g
 Gasteruption nigrescens Schletterer, 1885 g
 Gasteruption nigritarse Thomson, 1883 g
 Gasteruption opacum (Tournier, 1877) g
 Gasteruption oriplanum Kieffer, 1911 g
 Gasteruption ortegae Madl, 1991 g
 Gasteruption oshimense Watanabe, 1934 g
 Gasteruption parvicollarium Enderlein, 1913 g
 Gasteruption paternum Schletterer, 1889 g
 Gasteruption pedemontanum (Tournier, 1877) g
 Gasteruption phragmiticola Saure, 2006 g
 Gasteruption poecilothecum Kieffer, 1911 g
 Gasteruption psilomma Kieffer, 1904 g
 Gasteruption rufescenticorne Enderlein, 1913 g
 Gasteruption sarramea Jennings, Krogmann & Parslow, 2015 g
 Gasteruption schlettereri Magretti, 1890 g
 Gasteruption schossmannae Madl, 1987 g
 Gasteruption scintillans Pasteels, 1957 c g
 Gasteruption sinarum Kieffer, 1911 g
 Gasteruption sinepunctatum Zhao, van Achterberg & Xu, 2012 g
 Gasteruption sinicola g
 Gasteruption striatum b
 Gasteruption subtile (Thomson, 1883) g
 Gasteruption syriacum Szepligeti, 1903 g
 Gasteruption terebrelligerum Enderlein, 1913 g
 Gasteruption tonkinense Pasteels, 1958 g
 Gasteruption tournieri Schletterer, 1885 g
 Gasteruption transversiceps Pasteels, 1958 g
 Gasteruption undulatum (Abeille de Perrin, 1879) g
 Gasteruption variolosum (Abeille de Perrin, 1879) g
 Gasteruption varipes (Westwood, 1851) g
 Gasteruption visaliae b

Data sources: i = ITIS, c = Catalogue of Life, g = GBIF, b = Bugguide.net

References

Evanioidea